Bae Chang-ho (born May 16, 1953) is a South Korean director and screenwriter.

Filmography 
People of Kkobang Neighborhood (1982) - director, screenwriter
Iron Men (1983) - director, screenwriter
Flower on the Equator (1983) - director
Whale Hunting (1984) - director
The Winter That Year Was Warm (1984) - director
Deep Blue Night (1985) - director
Whale Hunting 2 (1985) - director
Hwang Jin-yi (1986) - director
Our Sweet Days of Youth (1987) - director, screenwriter
Hello, God! (1987) - director
Gagman (1989) - screenwriter, actor
The Dream (1990) - director, screenwriter
Stairways of Heaven (1992) - director
The Young Man (1994) - director, screenwriter, producer
Love Story (1996) - director, screenwriter, producer, actor
My Heart (2000) - director, screenwriter, producer
The Last Witness (2001) - director, screenwriter
Road (2006) - director, screenwriter, actor
The Trip (2010) - director, screenwriter
Casa Amor: Exclusive for Ladies (2015) - actor

Awards 
1983 3rd Korean Association of Film Critics Awards: Best Director (People of Kkobang Neighborhood)
1984 4th Korean Association of Film Critics Awards: Best Director (Whale Hunting)
1985 24th Grand Bell Awards: Best Director (Deep Blue Night) 
1988 8th Korean Association of Film Critics Awards: Best Screenplay (Our Sweet Days of Youth)
1996 16th Korean Association of Film Critics Awards: Best Screenplay (Love Story)
2000 1st Busan Film Critics Awards: Best Director (My Heart)

References

External links 
 
 
 

1953 births
Living people
South Korean film directors
South Korean screenwriters
South Korean film producers
Best Director Paeksang Arts Award (film) winners